Greek National Road 51 (abbreviated as EO51) is a single carriageway road in northeastern Greece. It connects the Greek National Road 2 (Florina - Thessaloniki - Alexandroupoli - Turkey) near Feres with the Bulgarian border near Ormenio. The main towns on the GR-51 are Didymoteicho and Orestiada. The entire GR-51 is part of the European route E85. Its length is about 128 km. It runs from south to north, parallel to the river Evros.

Route
The southern end of the GR-51 is in the village Ardani, part of the municipality Feres, about 40 km east of Alexandroupoli. Here it branches off the GR-2 (the old Egnatia Odos). 2 km north is a new interchange with the Egnatia Odos freeway. The highway bypasses Soufli, Didymoteicho and Orestiada. At Kastanies there is a connecting road to Karaağaç and Edirne in Turkey. The GR-51 ends at the Greek-Bulgarian border near Ormenio, where it connects with the Bulgarian national road 80 to Svilengrad. The only major river that the highway passes over is the Arda in the north. 

The Greek National Road 51 passes through the following places (south to north):
Ardani
Thymaria
Lykofos
Soufli (bypass)
Mandra
Lavara
Amorio
Didymoteicho (bypass)
Thourio
Orestiada (bypass)
Kavyli (bypass)
Kastanies (bypass)
Dikaia (bypass)
Ormenio

Roads in Eastern Macedonia and Thrace
51